A Primer of Libertarian Education is a 1975 book by Joel Spring on the tradition of libertarian (anarchist) education.

Bibliography

External links 

 Full text at the Internet Archive

1975 non-fiction books
Books about anarchism
Books about education
English-language books